Nuri Ok (November 10, 1942 – August 5, 2015) was a Turkish judge. He retired as the Chief Public Prosecutor of the Court of Cassation of Turkey. Ok was born in Tarsus, a town in the Mersin Province.

References

External links
  Nuri Ok at the official High Court of Appeals site

1942 births
2015 deaths
People from Tarsus, Mersin
Turkish civil servants
Court of Cassation (Turkey) justices
Turkish prosecutors